Vibe is the third studio album by Dutch-English pop group Caught in the Act. It was released by ZYX Music on 30 June 1997 in German-speaking Europe. The album peaked at number 4 on the German Albums Chart.

Track listing
Adapted from album booklet.

Charts

Weekly charts

Year-end charts

Release history

References

1997 albums
Caught in the Act albums
Albums produced by Steve Mac